Dicranopteris (forkedfern) is a genus of tropical ferns of the family Gleicheniaceae. There are about 20 described species.

Species
, Plants of the World Online accepted the following species:

Phylogeny of Dicranopteris

Unassigned species:
Dicranopteris alternans (Mett.) Yan & Wei
Dicranopteris clemensiae Holttum
Dicranopteris elegantula Pic.Serm.
Dicranopteris lanigera (D.Don) Fraser-Jenk.
Dicranopteris latiloba (Holtt.) Yan & Wei
Dicranopteris × nepalensis Fraser-Jenk.
Dicranopteris nervosa (Kaulf.) Ching
Dicranopteris pubigera (Blume) Nakai
Dicranopteris schomburgkiana (Sturm ex Mart.) C.V.Morton
Dicranopteris seminuda Maxon
Dicranopteris seramensis M.Kato
Dicranopteris speciosa (Presl) Holttum
Dicranopteris spissa (Fée) Lima & Salino

References

Gleicheniales
Fern genera